GLV may refer to: 
 GLV (TV station), in Victoria, Australia
 British Rail Class 489, an electrical multiple unit
 Golovin Airport, in Alaska, United States
 Grating light valve
 Green leaf volatiles
 Manx language
 Titan II GLV, an American launch vehicle